The 1993 Copenhagen Open doubles was the doubles event of the fifth edition of the Copenhagen Open, a tennis tournament held in Copenhagen, Denmark which was part of the ATP World Series and part of the European early indoor court season. Nicklas Kulti and Magnus Larsson were the defending champions, but were forced to withdraw before their semifinal match.

David Adams and Andrei Olhovskiy won the title by defeating Martin Damm and Daniel Vacek 6–3, 3–6, 6–3 in the final.

Seeds

Draw

Draw

References

External links
 Official results archive (ATP)
 Official results archive (ITF)

1993 Copenhagen Open - 2
1993 ATP Tour